"After the Dance" is a slow jam recorded by singer Marvin Gaye and released as the second single off Gaye's 1976 hit album I Want You. Though it received modest success, the song was widely considered to be one of Marvin's best ballads and served as part of the template for quiet storm and urban contemporary ballads that came afterwards.

Overview
Written by Gaye and his co-producer Leon Ware, the song narrates a moment where the author noticed a woman on Soul Train and convinces her to "get together" after the two shared a dance. Throughout the entire I Want You album, which was dedicated to Marvin's live-in lover Janis Hunter (who wrote a 2015 memoir entitled After the Dance: My Life with Marvin Gaye),<ref>Lary Wallace, "Marvin’s Muse", Los Angeles Review of Books, September 18, 2015.</ref> the narrator — Gaye — brings up the dance concept in songs such as "Since I Had You". 

The song also served in a funky instrumental, which included a synthesizer solo performed by GayeRitz (2003) just days before the master for the I Want You album was due at Motown. The instrumental version received a nomination at the 1977 Grammy Awards for Best R&B Instrumental Song.

The song was Gaye's lowest-peaked pop single for the first time in 13 years since the B-side of his "Can I Get a Witness" titled "I'm Crazy 'Bout My Baby", peaking at number 74, ironically three places higher than "I'm Crazy 'Bout My Baby", while it was a bigger success on the R&B chart, peaking at number 14.

Recording
The basic track of "After the Dance" was recorded for Gaye with the working title "Don't You Wanna Come?" on September 1975.

The overdubbing sessions took place between January 1976 to March 1976.

Covers
The song has since been covered by a legion of jazz vocalists and groups including Fourplay, who covered it with longtime Gaye admirer, R&B singer El DeBarge, in 1991. Their version was released as a single that year and re-introduced newer listeners to Gaye's original.

Hall & Oates covered the song on their 2004 album Our Kind of Soul''.

Personnel
Personnel per David Ritz and Harry Weinger. 

 Lead, background vocals, piano and synthesizer by Marvin Gaye
 Instrumentation by various studio musicians, some of which include, drummer James Gadson and flutist Ernie Watts (featured on the instrumental version)
 Orchestral arrangements by Coleridge-Taylor Perkinson
 Rhythm arrangements by Leon Ware
 Produced by Leon Ware and Marvin Gaye
 Recording engineering by Art Stewart and Fred Ross

References

1975 songs
1976 singles
Marvin Gaye songs
Songs written by Marvin Gaye
Songs written by Leon Ware
Funk ballads
Song recordings produced by Marvin Gaye
Downtempo songs
1970s ballads